Joe Steele may refer to:

 Joe Steele (American football) (born 1958), American football player
 Joe Steele (musician) (1899–1964), American jazz pianist and bandleader
 Joe Steele, a criminal involved in Glasgow Ice Cream Wars
 Joe Steele (novel), and the eponymous character

See also 
 Joseph Steele (1881–?), carpenter and political figure in Nova Scotia, Canada
 Joe Stell (born 1928), American politician in the New Mexico House of Representatives